Chalorjit Jittarutta was the first female judge in Thailand when she was appointed in 1965.

See also
List of first women lawyers and judges in Asia

References

Chalorjit Jittarutta
Possibly living people
Year of birth missing
20th-century women judges